Conocephalus attenuatus, the long-tailed meadow katydid or lance-tailed meadow katydid, is a species of meadow katydid in the family Tettigoniidae. It is found in North America.

References

attenuatus
Articles created by Qbugbot
Insects described in 1869